Come By Chance is a town on the isthmus of the Avalon Peninsula in Newfoundland and Labrador, Canada. It is in Division 1 on Placentia Bay.

The associated port was Canada's fifth largest port by cargo tonnage loaded and unloaded in 2011. It handled 27.4 million metric tonnes, of which 23.7 million tonnes was crude petroleum.

History 
The town's name is believed to be the result of explorers coming upon a Beothuk path by chance, and naming the location after the unexpected discovery.

Come By Chance was chosen as the location for a Canadian cottage hospital in 1936.

In February 2018, a group of oil refinery workers split a Canadian lottery winning of $60,000,000.

Demographics 

Notable people 
 Bob Gladney, National Hockey League player

See also
 List of cities and towns in Newfoundland and Labrador

References

External links

Populated coastal places in Canada
Towns in Newfoundland and Labrador